Gaurav Gogoi is an Indian politician of Indian National Congress  from the Indian state of  Assam. He is son of former chief minister of Assam Tarun Gogoi. He contested the Indian general elections 2014 and 2019  from Kaliabor seat and won. Gaurav left his job at Airtel to join a Delhi-based NGO called Pravah in 2005.

Early life and personal life
Gaurav Gogoi was born in 1982. His father Tarun Gogoi (died on 23 November 2020) served as Chief Minister of Assam from 2001 to 2016 as the longest-serving chief minister of the state. He graduated from St. Columba's School in Delhi. He then completed B.Tech. in Electronics and Communication Engineering in 2004 from Indraprastha University, Delhi and then joined the marketing team of Airtel. He later went to the United States of America to study public administration. He holds a Master of Public Administration from New York University.
He also enjoys dancing and choreography. In 2013, Gaurav married UK-born Elizabeth Colebourn. In 2014, Gaurav joined the Congress Party and is the Member of the Indian Parliament for Kaliabor (Assumed office 1 September 2014). He and his wife have 2 children - one son and one daughter, (born 2016 and 2020).

Political career
Upon his return, he entered politics and said that he would do whatever the party wanted him to do. In March 2014, the Congress Party announced Gogoi as its candidate from Kaliabor (Lok Sabha constituency). After the announcement, Gogoi filed his nomination on 19 March 2014.
He won his first election polling a total of 443,315 votes beating his nearest rival, Mrinal Kumar Saikia of BJP by over 93,000 votes.

References

Living people
1982 births
New York University alumni 
India MPs 2014–2019
Lok Sabha members from Assam
India MPs 2019–present